Sir Lyman Melvin Jones (21 September 1843 – 15 April 1917) was a Canadian businessman and politician.

Born into a farming family near Whitchurch, Upper Canada, Jones settled as a young man in Winnipeg, Manitoba, where he was the representative of A. Harris, Son and Company of Brantford. Following the merger of the Massey Manufacturing Co. and Harris's company, Jones became, in 1891, the general manager of the newly formed Massey-Harris Company based in Toronto, Ontario. On 21 January 1901, he was appointed to the Senate of Canada on the recommendation of Sir Wilfrid Laurier, and represented the senatorial division of Toronto, Ontario, as a Liberal until his death.

In 1887 and 1888, he served as Mayor of Winnipeg.

References

External links 
 
 

1843 births
1917 deaths
Businesspeople from Ontario
Businesspeople from Winnipeg
Canadian Knights Bachelor
Canadian senators from Ontario
Finance ministers of Manitoba
Liberal Party of Canada senators
Mayors of Winnipeg
Members of the Executive Council of Manitoba
People from Whitchurch-Stouffville